The 1937 Football Championship of UkrSSR were part of the 1937 Soviet republican football competitions in the Soviet Ukraine.

Persha Hrupa
Promoted: Kryla Rad Zaporizhia (Druha Hrupa), Sudnobudivnyk-2 Mykolaiv (Druha Hrupa), Spartak Dnipropetrovsk, Vympel Kyiv, Zenit Stalino

Championship play-off
 FC Spartak Dnipropetrovsk – FC Zenit Stalino 2:0

Druha Hrupa
Promoted: Stal Dniprodzerzhynsk (Tretia Hrupa), Rot-Front Kryvyi Rih (Tretia Hrupa)

Tretia Hrupa
Promoted: Voroshylovsk (Chetverta Hrupa), Mohyliv-Podilskyi (Chetverta Hrupa), Tiraspol
1/4 final
 Voroshylovsk — Kupiansk 7 : 1 (or 7 : 0)
 Poltava — Kherson 4 : 0
 Tiraspol — Zhytomyr 4 : 1
 Kamianets-Podilsk — Mohyliv-Podilskyi + : - (no show)

Consolation matches

1/2 finals
 Kherson — Kupiansk + : — (no show)

Match for 5th place
 Zhytomyr — Kherson 4 : 1 (or 5 : 1)
 
1/2 finals
 Voroshylovsk — Poltava + : - (no show)
 Tiraspol — Kamianets-Podilskyi 4 : 1
 
Final
 Voroshylovsk — Tiraspol 4 : 2

Chetverta Hrupa
Promoted: Shostka, Konotop
1/4 finals
 Berdychiv — Shostka + : - (no show)
 Sumy — Konotop 1 : 2
 Stal Makiivka — Chystiakove 2 : 1
 Ordzhonikidze — Kremenchuk 5 : 1

Consolation matches

1/2 finals
 Chystiakove — Kremenchuk 1 : 4

Match for the 5th place
 Sumy — Kremenchuk + : - (no show)

1/2 finals
 Berdychiv — Konotop 2 : 1
 Stal Makiivka — Ordzhonikidze 2 : 1

Match for the 3rd place
 Ordzhonikidze — Konotop 7 : 0
 
Final
 Berdychiv — Stal Makiivka 1 : 5

Hrupa Pyat A
Relegated: Starobilsk (Chetverta Hrupa), Kirovo (Chetverta Hrupa), Krasnyi Luch (Chetverta Hrupa)
1/4 finals
 Sloviansk — Starobilsk 1:2
 Voznesensk — Kirovo 1:0
 Berdyansk — Mariupol +:- (no show)
 Druzhkivka — Krasnyi Luch 3:1

Consolation matches

1/2 finals
 Kirovo — Sloviansk + : - (no show)

Match for the 5th place
 Krasnyi Luch — Kirovo + : - (no show)

1/2 finals
 Starobilsk — Voznesensk 1:2
 Berdyansk — Druzhkivka 2:1

Match for the 3rd place
 Starobilsk — Druzhkivka 0:3

Final
 Voznesensk — Berdyansk 1:0

Hrupa Pyat B
Relegated: Postysheve (Chetverta Hrupa), Melitopol (Chetverta Hrupa), Korosten (Chetverta Hrupa)
1/4 finals
 Postysheve — Rubizhne 2:1
 Synelnykove — Melitopol +:- (no show)
 Koziatyn — Korosten 1:3
 Novohrad-Volynskyi — Uman 4:2

Consolation matches

1/2 finals
 Uman — Koziatyn + : - (no show)

Match for the 5th place
 Uman — Rubizhne + : - (no show)

1/2 finals
 Postysheve — Synelnykove 7:1
 Korosten — Novohrad-Volynskyi 0:1

Match for the 3rd place
 Korosten — Synelnykove + : - (no show)

Final
 Postysheve — Novohrad-Volynskyi 2:1

Ukrainian clubs at the All-Union level
 Group A (1): Dynamo Kyiv
 Group V (8): Dynamo Odesa, Lokomotyv Kyiv, Stakhanovets Stalino, Dynamo Dnipropetrovsk, Traktor Kharkiv, Spartak Kharkiv, Silmash Kharkiv, Dynamo Kharkiv
 Group G (2): z-d im. Frunze Kostiantynivka, Stal Dnipropetrovsk
 Group D (3): Lokomotyv Dnipropetrovsk (debut), Sudnobudivnyk Mykolaiv, Spartak Kyiv (debut)

Withdrawn
 (all-Union level) Stal (z-d im. Lenina) Dnipropetrovsk
 (Republican) Artemivsk

See also
 1937 Cup of the Ukrainian SSR

References

External links
 1937. Football Championship of the UkrSSR (1937. Первенство УССР.) Luhansk Nash Futbol.
 1937 (1937 год). History of Soviet championships among KFK.

Ukraine
Football Championship of the Ukrainian SSR
Championship